Johan Wilhelm Niemann (born 26 June 1977) is a Swedish musician best known as the current bassist of Evergrey and for co-founding the band Mind's Eye. He was also a member of Swedish heavy metal band Therion and Scandinavian metal band Evil Masquerade, among others. He is the brother of Kristian Niemann.

Bands
Niemann is/was a member of the following bands:
Evergrey
Mind's Eye
Therion
Evil Masquerade
Demonoid
Afterglow
Chris Catena
Hubi Meisel
Frasse Haraldsen
Lithium
Moonstone
Novak
Tears of Anger
The Murder of My Sweet

References

External links
Evil Masquerade official website
2019 interview with musicexistence.com

Therion (band) members
Swedish heavy metal bass guitarists
1977 births
Living people
Evil Masquerade members
21st-century bass guitarists
Evergrey members
Demonoid (band) members